is a former Japanese footballer who played for Zweigen Kanazawa.

Club statistics
Updated to 2 February 2018.

References

External links

Profile at Zweigen Kanazawa

1988 births
Living people
Tokoha University alumni
Association football people from Kyoto Prefecture
Japanese footballers
J2 League players
J3 League players
Japan Football League players
Zweigen Kanazawa players
Association football midfielders